Sex Offenders: An Analysis of Types is a 1965 book about sex offenders by the anthropologist Paul Gebhard, the sociologist John Gagnon, the sexologist Wardell Pomeroy, and Cornelia Christenson. It was a publication of the Institute for Sex Research.

Pomeroy writes that Sex Offenders was an "enormous and definitive volume" and that it met with good reviews. The child psychiatrist Robert Coles reviewed Sex Offenders in The New Republic. The book received a notice in the Harvard Law Review.

References

Bibliography
Books

 
 

Journals

  
  

1965 non-fiction books
American non-fiction books
Books by Cornelia Christenson
Books by John Gagnon
Books by Paul Gebhard
Books by Wardell Pomeroy
English-language books
Harper & Row books
Non-fiction books about sexuality